Icaraí de Minas is a municipality in the north of the state of Minas Gerais in Brazil.   the population was 12,097 in an area of 617 km².  
The elevation of the municipal seat is 595 meters.  
It became a municipality in 1993.  
The postal code (CEP) is 39318-000.
Statistical microregion:  Januária

Icaraí de Minas is located south of  São Francisco and northwest of Montes Claros.  It is connected to major population centers by dirt roads.

The economy is based on agriculture with emphasis on cattle raising.  There were 34,000 head in 2006.  The main agricultural crops were corn, manioc, sugarcane, and rice.  The GDP was R$24,717,000 in 2005.

Municipal Human Development Index: .650 (2000)
State ranking: 742 out of 853 municipalities 
National ranking: 3,776 out of 5,138 municipalities 
(For the complete list see Frigoletto)

References

IBGE

See also
List of municipalities in Minas Gerais

Municipalities in Minas Gerais